Alex J. Robinson (born May 9, 1985) is a female country music singer/songwriter.

History
In 2008, Alex J. Robinson issued her debut album, Never Say Never. The album contained her debut single, "Breakin' on the Love Thing", which peaked at No. 21 on the Radio and Records Canadian country chart.  Her second album, The Getaway, was released in 2010.  Both albums were released on Thorniac Records, a label co-owned by Robinson's partner, Tim Thorney.

In 2008, Robinson was nominated for the Canadian Country Music Awards' best new female artist but lost to Jessie Farrell

Robinson was also featured in an Ontario Tourism commercial, performing "There's No Place Like This."

Discography

Albums

Singles

Music videos

Awards and nominations

References

External links
 

1985 births
Living people
Musicians from Greater Sudbury
Canadian country singer-songwriters
Canadian women country singers
21st-century Canadian women singers